Global Underground 008: Nick Warren, Brazil is a DJ mix album in the Global Underground series, compiled and mixed by Nick Warren. The mix is a retrospective look at a set in São Paulo, Brazil.

Nick Warren returns for his second Global Underground outing, choosing to work with Andy and James again, who had earned his respect by allowing him complete artistic freedom with his GU003 mix.

Unusually for a GU release, the title chosen represents a whole nation rather than a specific city. It was actually inspired by a set he played in Brazil’s dynamic city of São Paulo, although the music is pure international electronica.

The mix is considered a GU classic by many, and is a fine example of the famous art of taking the listener on the proverbial musical 'journey’.

Track listing

Disc one 

 PMT - Marching Powder  – 6:29
 Desert - Lose It (To the Sound)  – 1:55
 DJ Gogo - Sequenza (Version 1)  – 6:53
 E-Razor - India  – 4:51
 Capricorn - All I Am (Yum Yum Mix)  – 5:01
 PMT - Tequila Flange  – 3:50
 Yin Yunk - Rise & Fall (Rise Mix)  – 7:07
 Stone Factory - New Sunset  – 6:17
 Locust - No One in the World (Slacker Mix)  – 5:31
 Origin - Tidle Protaxis  – 8:38
 Junk Project - Miralaca  – 4:04
 Conscious - Northern Lights (Pob Remix)  – 6:45
 V.F.R. - Tranceillusion (Taucher Mix)  – 7:29

Disc two 

Slacker - Psychout (Thing)  – 5:25
Madagascar - You're Beautiful (JCB Mix)  – 5:53
Hybrid - Kill City  – 5:11
The Forth - Reality Detached  – 4:43
Voices Of Kwahn A.D. - Ya Yae Ya Yo Yo Yo (The Light Remix)  – 8:31
Nickelson - Aquaphonic  – 2:36
Energy 52 - Café del Mar '98 (Nalin & Kane Mix)  – 7:44
Tekara - Breathe In You (Tekara's M&M Dub)  – 7:47
Anthony & Georgio - Equilibrium  – 6:29
Pink Bomb - Indica  – 5:15
Serpico - Dreamscape  – 4:57
Propulsion - Pressure  – 4:00
Pob - Boiler  – 6:18

References

External links 

Global Underground
1998 compilation albums
DJ mix albums